The Bigbiga Protected Landscape (also spelled Bigbigga) is a protected landscape of forested hills, open grasslands and natural springs in Ilocos Sur in the northwestern part of the island of Luzon, Philippines. It is one of five protected landscape areas in the Ilocos Region under the Philippines' National Integrated Protected Areas System.  The park has a total area of  located entirely within the municipality of Narvacan. It was created in 1939 as the Bigbiga Spring Watershed Forest Reserve by virtue of Proclamation No. 431 signed by President Manuel Luis Quezon. In 2000, it was reclassified as a protected landscape by Proclamation No. 290.

Description
Bigbiga extends from the village of Cadacad to Sitio Mata in the village of Marozo in eastern Narvacan near its border with Nagbukel municipality. Fifty percent of the area is bushland with the remaining area consisting of open grassland. Letac Creek borders it to the south which supplies water to the three sitios of Marozo.

The landscape is covered primarily by shrubs and commercial tree species such as tuai, kalumpit, dao and balete tree. The open grassland supports gmelina and mahogany.

Access to the park is via Orence Road from the main highway (Manila North Road) and Narvacan town proper in the west.

See also
 Northern Luzon Heroes Hill National Park
 Santa Lucia Protected Landscape

References

Protected landscapes of the Philippines
Springs of the Philippines
Geography of Ilocos Sur
Landforms of Ilocos Sur
Protected areas established in 1939
1939 establishments in the Philippines